Tobruk Stadium is a multi-purpose stadium in Tobruk, Libya.  It is currently used mostly for football matches and is the home ground of Al Soukour.  The stadium holds 2,000 people.

External links
Stadium information World Stadium

Football venues in Libya
Multi-purpose stadiums in Libya
Tobruk